Fútbol Americas is a TV show that is streaming exclusively on ESPN+. It is hosted by Sebastian Salazar and Herculez Gomez.

History 
On March 4, 2021, it was announced that a new studio show, Fútbol Americas, would first air on March 8, 2021.

Programming 
Fútbol Americas is broadcast on Mondays and Thursdays at 8:30 p.m. Eastern.

The show focuses specifically on soccer in CONCACAF, mostly MLS, the U.S. men's national team, Liga MX, and the Mexico men's national football team. The show also highlights CONCACAF players playing in Europe or abroad.

Additional hosts/guests 
Since the start of the show, many players from across CONCACAF teams have come on the show and done an interview.

In addition, Julie Foudy has appeared on numerous occasions to provide insight about the National Women's Soccer League and U.S. women's national team.

Current Orlando Pride player Ali Krieger has also appeared on the show multiple times.

Mauricio Pedroza has also appeared in place of Salazar when needed.

References 

Association football television series